Shyla is a feminine given name, comparable to the English and Irish Sheila. In Sanskrit, it means goddess Parvathi and in English it means white dove.

People with the given name
Shyla Angela Prasad (born 1995), model, actress and beauty pageant titleholder
Shyla Heal (born 2001), Australian basketball player
Shyla Stylez (1982–2017), Canadian pornographic actress

People with the surname 
Yaraslav Shyla (born 1993), Belarusian tennis player

See also
Shayla (disambiguation)